Wawa is a prefecture located in the Plateaux Region of Togo. The prefecture seat is located in Badou.

Canton (administrative divisions) of Wawa include Badou, Tomégbé, Kpété-Bena, Gobé, Klabè-Efoukpa, Okou, Ekéto, Ounabé, Késsibo, Gbadi-N’Kugna, and Doumé.

References 

Prefectures of Togo
Plateaux Region, Togo